Military occupations of the Dominican Republic have occurred several times, including:

 Haitian occupation of the Dominican Republic, from 1822 to 1844 

Spanish occupation of the Dominican Republic, from 1861 to 1865
United States occupation of the Dominican Republic (1916–24)
United States occupation of the Dominican Republic (1965–66) (more properly, the Organization of American States occupation of the Dominican Republic)